.college is a generic-top-level domain (gTLD) used in the domain name system of the Internet. It was delegated to the Root Zone of the DNS on 10 April 2014, completing the successful application for the string. The .college back-end registry operations are provided by CentralNic. Unlike .edu, .college is open for registration to the general public.

Background 
.college is owned and operated by XYZ.COM LLC, located in Las Vegas and Santa Monica.

Intended users 
The main demographic for .college domains are entities close to, affiliated with, or which otherwise do business with/in higher education institutions but which are not entitled to a .edu domain or subdomain.

 Educational
 Universities and/or university departments (outside the United States)
 College athletics departments
 Non-accredited institutions
 College prep
 Online education
 Corporate
 Recruitment
 Training & development
 College town businesses
 Individuals
 College faculty and staff
 Students and alumni
 On-campus organizations
 Message boards
 Social media & networking
 Entertainment

Launch periods 
The .college trademark-exclusive sunrise phase began on March 17, 2015 and ran until April 17, 2015. Its landrush period, which was exclusively for educational institutions, opened on April 20, 2015 and ran until September 22nd, 2015. XYZ announced that it would waive the application fee and first year's registration fee for companies registered in the Trademark Clearinghouse, as well as Educational Institutions during the landrush period. It was launched into global general availability on September 29, 2015.

References

External links
 go.college

Generic top-level domains
Internet properties established in 2014
2014 establishments in the United States